Vedran Ćorluka (born 5 February 1986) is a Croatian football coach and former player who played as a centre-back. He is an assistant to Zlatko Dalić in the Croatia national team.   

Ćorluka graduated from the Dinamo Zagreb Youth Academy, before making his professional debut for the senior team in 2003. In 2007, he made a £8 million move to Premier League club Manchester City, and after a season moved on to Tottenham Hotspur. He spent four seasons there before joining Lokomotiv Moscow, where he eventually retired in 2021.

As a Croatia international, Ćorluka has earned 103 caps for the country, making him one of the nation's most capped players. He represented Croatia at various youth levels before making his senior debut in August 2006, in a friendly match against Italy. He was part of the country's squad at the UEFA European Championships in 2008, 2012, 2016 and at the FIFA World Cups in 2014 and 2018. In August 2018, Ćorluka confirmed his retirement from international football.

Club career

Early days
Ćorluka was born in Derventa, SR Bosnia and Herzegovina, SFR Yugoslavia. His parents, Jozo and Anđa, come from Modran, a village near Derventa. Due to the Bosnian War, in 1992 the family moved to Zagreb, where his father still works as an engineer in addition to being Ćorluka's manager. His mother is a judge. Vedran has one brother. Ćorluka began playing football in Dinamo Zagreb's youth teams when he was eight years old, impressing many scouts from the youth academy. His professional career began in 2003, but during that season he made no appearance for the first team. He was sent on a one-year loan to Inter Zaprešić, helping the team place second in the league, before returning to Dinamo in 2005. After establishing himself as a key player for Dinamo, he helped the club win the Croatian First League title three seasons in a row from 2005–06. He also played a dominant part in his side capturing the Croatian Cup in the 2006 season.

Manchester City
After consistently strong performances, Ćorluka was signed by English Premier League side Manchester City on 2 August 2007. City did not reveal the fee, though Croatian media reports suggested the deal was worth around £8 million, with the 21-year-old penning a five-year deal.

As usual, Ćorluka consistently found a starting spot for his side in the Premier League. Despite a nightmare blunder during his side's shocking 6–0 defeat to Chelsea at Stamford Bridge, he remained strong during his first season in England as his side finished ninth in the league and gained entry to a UEFA Cup qualifying round via the UEFA fair play ranking. On few rare occasions, he was also used as a defensive midfielder during the season, proving to be a factor for opposing attackers.

Ćorluka scored his first goal in the 4–2 loss at Aston Villa on the opening weekend of the 2008–09 season. In the UEFA Cup second qualifying round match second leg, Ćorluka scored the decisive spot kick in the dramatic 4–2 penalty shoot-out victory over Danish minnows Midtjylland after the tie had ended 1–1 on aggregate. He played his last match for City against Sunderland on 31 August 2008, throwing his shirt into the crowd at the end of the match.

Tottenham Hotspur

On 1 September 2008, it was announced that Ćorluka had signed for Tottenham Hotspur for a fee of £8.5 million on a six-year contract, joining his fellow Croatian international and best friend Luka Modrić at the club. During the match against Stoke City on 19 October, Ćorluka was severely injured; kneed under his chin by teammate Heurelho Gomes, he was immediately knocked unconscious. After ten minutes of on-field treatment, he was rushed to hospital where it was announced no serious damage was evident. In the League Cup final on 1 March 2009, Ćorluka scored his and Tottenham's only penalty in the shootout loss to Manchester United, receiving a runners up medal for his efforts.

Ćorluka scored his first Premier League goal for Spurs during a 2–2 draw against Bolton Wanderers on 3 October 2009. On 2 February 2011, he started and played the full 90 minutes at right-back ahead of the injured Alan Hutton in the 1–0 victory over Blackburn Rovers at Ewood Park.

Bayer Leverkusen (loan)
In the January 2012 transfer window, Ćorluka signed on loan for German Bundesliga club Bayer Leverkusen for the remainder of the 2011–12 season on 31 January, with the option to buy out his contract in the summer transfer window.

Ćorluka made his debut for the club in a 2–2 home draw against VfB Stuttgart at the BayArena on 4 February, playing the full 90 minutes. In his only Champions League appearance for the club, Ćorluka provided the cross for Michal Kadlec's leveler in the 52nd minute in a 3–1 loss to Barcelona. On 25 February, the defender provided an assist for the first of Lars Bender's brace in the 2–0 win over 1. FC Köln.

Lokomotiv Moscow

On 27 June 2012, Lokomotiv Moscow announced the signing of Ćorluka from Tottenham for £5.5 million. The signing came in light of recent naming of former Croatia national team Slaven Bilić as the manager of Lokomotiv. Ćorluka signed a three-year contract following the successful completion of his medical examination. He scored on his debut against newly promoted Mordovia Saransk in a 3–2 victory. In September 2012, March 2014, and December 2014 Ćorluka won the monthly poll among Loko supporters in the social networks and was named the best club player of the month. In June 2015, after Ćorluka helped Lokomotiv to win Russian Cup, fans named him team's Player of the Year.

On 1 April 2021, Ćorluka announced his departure from the club at the end of the season. He played his last game for Lokomotiv in a 1–0 victory over Ural Yekaterinburg.

International career

He started to play for the Croatia under-21 team and eventually progressed to his country's senior national team, for which he soon made his debut in the friendly match against world champions Italy on 16 August 2006 in Livorno. Croatia won the match 2–0 and Ćorluka, aged 20 during his debut, entered the game in the second half and satisfied critics with his very good, solid performance against experienced Serie A forwards.

During Croatia's UEFA Euro 2008 qualifying campaign, he became one of the key players under head coach Slaven Bilić. Croatia finished first in Group E, notably ahead of Russia and favourites England, who eventually failed to qualify from the group.

Ćorluka was in the final match of the tournament where Croatia's exit came against Turkey in extra time and penalties. Turkey winger Arda Turan revealed in an interview with UEFA that Ćorluka is the most difficult right-back he has ever played against, whom he came up against during this match.

The defender was included for the preliminary squad for Euro 2012 in Poland and Ukraine after impressive performances in his loan spell at Bayer Leverkusen.

Ćorluka was included in Croatia's squad for the 2018 FIFA World Cup in Russia. On 21 June, he came on as an added-time substitute for Mario Mandžukić in a 3–0 group stage win over Argentina at the Nizhny Novgorod Stadium, earning his 100th cap.

On 10 August 2018, Ćorluka retired from international football, confirming his retirement via social media.

Managerial career 
On 17 May 2021, Ćorluka was officially presented as Zlatko Dalić's assistant for the upcoming UEFA Euro 2020, succeeding Ivica Olić. At the press conference, Ćorluka expressed his wish to enroll in a coaching academy after the tournament.

On 6 July 2021, he returned to Lokomotiv Moscow, also as an assistant coach, while still remaining the assistant coach of Croatia. On 19 July, he left Lokomotiv due to family reasons.

Personal life 
Ćorluka married his long-time girlfriend, Croatian singer Franka Batelić on 21 July 2018.

On 5 January 2020, Ćorluka and Batelić became parents of a baby boy they named Viktor.

Career statistics

Club

International
Appearances and goals by national team and year

International goals
Scores and results list Croatia's goal tally first

Honours
Dinamo Zagreb
 Prva HNL: 2005–06, 2006–07
 Croatian Cup: 2006–07
 Croatian Super Cup: 2006

Tottenham Hotspur
 Football League Cup runner-up: 2008–09

Lokomotiv Moscow
 Russian Premier League: 2017–18
 Russian Cup: 2014–15, 2016–17, 2018–19, 2020–21
 Russian Super Cup: 2019

Croatia
 FIFA World Cup runner-up: 2018

Individual
Lokomotiv Moscow player of the year by club supporters: 2015
Vatrena krila heart of the supporters Award: 2016

Orders
Order of Duke Branimir: 2018

See also
List of men's footballers with 100 or more international caps

References

External links

1986 births
Living people
People from Derventa
Croatian footballers
Association football defenders
GNK Dinamo Zagreb players
NK Inter Zaprešić players
Manchester City F.C. players
Tottenham Hotspur F.C. players
Bayer 04 Leverkusen players
FC Lokomotiv Moscow players
Croatian Football League players
Premier League players
Bundesliga players
Russian Premier League players
Croatia youth international footballers
Croatia under-21 international footballers
Croatia international footballers
UEFA Euro 2008 players
UEFA Euro 2012 players
2014 FIFA World Cup players
UEFA Euro 2016 players
2018 FIFA World Cup players
FIFA Century Club
Croatian expatriate footballers
Expatriate footballers in England
Expatriate footballers in Germany
Expatriate footballers in Russia
Croatian expatriate sportspeople in England
Croatian expatriate sportspeople in Germany
Croatian expatriate sportspeople in Russia
Croats of Bosnia and Herzegovina
Bosnia and Herzegovina emigrants to Croatia
Yugoslav Wars refugees